Chemotronics is an intersection field of chemistry (especially electrochemistry) and electronics dealing with the design of electrochemical and optical chemical sensors. One of pioneers of this field was Alexander Frumkin.

See also
Amperostat
Bioelectrochemistry
Bioelectronics
Electrochemical engineering
Potentiostat

Notes

External links
IEEE

Analytical chemistry
Sensors